NGC 7303 is a barred spiral galaxy around 170 million light-years from Earth in the constellation Pegasus. NGC 7303 was discovered by astronomer John Herschel on September 15, 1828.

See also
 NGC 4036
 NGC 1300 
 List of NGC objects (7001–7840)

References

External links

Astronomical objects discovered in 1828
Pegasus (constellation)
7303
Barred spiral galaxies
069061
12065